Schistura sertata is a species of ray-finned fish, a stone loach, in the genus Schistura. It is only found in the Nam Xi, a small stream near Luang Prabang in Laos, where it was found between tree roots and among leaf litter within the stream.

References

S
Fish described in 2000